Tutu is both a surname and a given name.

People with the surname
Desmond Tutu (1931–2021), South African archbishop, activist against apartheid, and Nobel Peace Prize winner
Nomalizo Leah Tutu (born 1933), his wife
Desmond Tutu (footballer) (born 1957) Solomon Islands footballer
Osei Kofi Tutu I (died 1717), Ashantehene, ruler of Kumasi, co-founder of the Empire of Ashanti
Otumfuo Nana Osei Tutu II (born 1950), 16th Asantehene, King of the Ashanti
Julia Osei Tutu, his wife
Skelley Adu Tutu (born 1979), Ghanaian footballer
Constantin Țuțu (born 1987), a Moldovan Muay Thai kickboxer
Tutu Chengcui (died 820), a powerful eunuch during the reign of Chinese Emperor Xianzong

People with the given name
Tutu (Egyptian official), an official during the period 1350–1335 BC
Tutu Atwell (born 1999), American football player
Tutu Jones (b. 1966), an American blues musician
Tutu Puoane (born 1979), a South African jazz singer

See also
Tutu (disambiguation)